Velius may refer to:

 Norbertas Vėlius (1938-1996), Lithuanian folklorist
 Velius Longus, 2nd-century Latin grammarian
 Velius, a fictional character in the 1997 Playstation 1 game Final Fantasy Tactics
 Caspar Ursinus Velius (1493-1539), German humanist

See also
 Veliu, a surname